The 2011 Hazfi Cup Final was a two-legged football tie in order to determine the 2010–11 Hazfi Cup champion of Iranian football clubs. Persepolis faced Malavan in this final game. The first leg took place on June 7, 2011 at 19:45 IRDT (UTC+4:30) at Azadi Stadium in Tehran and the second leg took place on June 10, 2011 at 17:00 local time (UTC+4:30) at Takhti Stadium, Bandar Anzali.

Format
The rules for the final were exactly the same as the one for the previous knockout rounds. The tie was contested over two legs with away goals deciding the winner if the two teams were level on goals after the second leg. If the teams could still not be separated at that stage, then extra time would have been played with a penalty shootout (taking place if the teams were still level after that).

Road to the finals

Final Summary

Leg 1

Leg 2

Champions

See also 
 2010–11 Persian Gulf Cup
 2010–11 Azadegan League
 2010–11 Iran Football's 2nd Division
 2010–11 Iran Football's 3rd Division
 2010–11 Hazfi Cup
 Iranian Super Cup
 2010–11 Iranian Futsal Super League

References

2011
Haz
Persepolis F.C. matches